Kurukshetra is a 2008 Indian Malayalam language war film written and directed by Major Ravi. It is a prequel to the 2006 film Keerthi Chakra and the second installment in the Major Mahadevan film series, with Mohanlal reprising his role as Colonel Mahadevan The film is based on the Kargil conflict of 1999 between India and Pakistan. The political situation of the conflict is portrayed from an Indian perspective.

The film was released on October 28 coinciding with Diwali. It was a box office success and was one of the highest-grossing Malayalam films of the year. The third film in the series Kandahar was released in 2010 and the fourth film 1971: Beyond Borders was released in 2017.

Plot
The story revolves around the 1999 Kargil War between India and Pakistan. It revolves around the Battle of Tololing between Indian Army Colonel Mahadevan and Pakistani Army Colonel Chengiz. In the climax, India wins the war and Mahadevan kills Chengiz and avenges the brutal murder of many Indian soldiers.

Cast

 Mohanlal as Colonel Mahadevan, CO- 2 JAT
 Siddique as Subedar Major Fussy Ahmed, 2 JAT
 Biju Menon as Major Rajesh, 2 JAT
 Ravi Mariya as Brigadier Krishna, 2 JAT
 Sania Singh as Captain Lekshmi Rajesh, army doctor
 Manikuttan as Naik Prakash
 Pradeep Chandran as Naik Saravanan, Radio Operator
 Rony David as Naik Sasi
 Saju Attingal as Naik Swaminathan
 Sudheer Sukumaran as Havildar Johnson
 Anu Anand as Lieutenant Saurabh Kalia
 Major Kishore as Major Jerry Prem Raj 
 Kannan Pattambi as Naik  Kannan, Cook
 Anil as Naik Anilkumar
 Cochin Haneefa as Havildar
 Bineesh Kodiyeri as Naik  Bineesh
 Suraj Venjaramoodu as Naik 
 Anjana Chandran as Alma, Kashmiri Girl
 Anil Murali as Squadron Leader Ajay (Indian Air Force officer)
 Joy John Antony as Soldier
 Assim Jamal as Hyder, Pakistani officer
 Sukumari as Fussy's mother (Cameo)
 Kavitha Nair as Swaminathan's wife
 Major Ravi (Cameo appearance)

Soundtrack

The film have four songs composed by debutant Siddharth Vipin, with lyrics by Gireesh Puthenchery and Bombay S. Kamal (Chalo Chalo).

See also
Kargil War

References

External links

2008 films
2000s Malayalam-language films
Indian war films
Indian sequel films
HMajor2
Indian Army in films
Films directed by Major Ravi
India–Pakistan relations in popular culture